The Microsoft Institute for High Performance Computing was created in November 2005 at the University of Southampton. The only one of its kind in the UK. It is one of nine such institutes worldwide.

History
The creation of the institute was announced by Bill Gates during the International Supercomputing Conference in 2005, and the institute itself is currently led by Professor Simon J. Cox while Dr. Kenji Takeda, co-director, left the University of Southampton to join Microsoft. 

In 2006 Microsoft was working on a proof-of-concept implementation of a bespoke engineering workflow software for BAE Systems. The large British aerospace company wanted to run its SOLAR software on the Microsoft Cluster Server. The teams at the University of Southampton, BAE Systems and Microsoft managed to build a demonstrator in just 3 weeks. This comprised an SQL Server back-end and a Net 2.0 Web Service.

Research
The institute has conducted research in:
 Computational fluid dynamics
 Computational electromagnetics
 Electrical grid technologies
 Conference XP
 SQL
 WinFS
 Windows Communication Foundation
 Microsoft Cluster Server

Reception
Microsoft Visual Studio's Product Manager Dennis Crain referring to the MIHPC in Southampton said:

List of MIHPCs worldwide
 University of Southampton
 TACC - University of Texas Austin
 University of Utah
 University of Stuttgart
 Shanghai Jiao Tong University
 Nizhny Novgorod University
 University of Tennessee
 Tokyo Institute of technology
 Shanghai Supercomputer Center

Notes

External links
 Blog

Institute for High Performance Computing
University of Southampton